"Paranoid" is a song by American rapper and singer Post Malone and the opening track of his second studio album Beerbongs & Bentleys (2018). It was produced by Cashio, with co-production from Blueysport and additional production from Louis Bell.

Background
During his performance at the Rolling Loud festival in 2021, Post Malone revealed that his inspiration for writing the song was from losing trust in his best friend in the music industry.

Composition
In the song, Post Malone sings about being convinced that his enemies are following him, sleeping with a gun beside him, family and friends turning against him, and the overall feeling that he cannot trust anyone. He also compares himself to whistleblower Edward Snowden at one point. Evan Rytlewski of Pitchfork described Malone's singing in the song as 'guttural, belted delivery".

Charts

Certifications

References

2018 songs
Post Malone songs
Songs written by Post Malone
Songs written by Louis Bell
Song recordings produced by Louis Bell